Leigh Sembaluk (born 2 November 1985) is a Canadian soccer player who played five games for the Rochester Rhinos in the USL First Division in 2008.

External links
Player profile at the Rochester Rhinos

1985 births
Living people
Sportspeople from Regina, Saskatchewan
Canadian soccer players
Rochester New York FC players
Soccer people from Saskatchewan
Simon Fraser Clan men's soccer players
USL First Division players
Vancouver Whitecaps FC non-playing staff
Canadian people of Ukrainian descent
Association football defenders